The United States House Committee on Mines and Mining is a defunct committee of the U.S. House of Representatives. 

The Committee on Mines and Mining was created on December 19, 1865, for consideration of subjects relating to mining interests. It exercised jurisdiction over the Geological Survey, the Bureau of Mines, the establishment of mining schools and mining experimental stations, mineral land laws, the welfare of men working in mines, mining debris, relief in cases of mineral contracts connected with the prosecution of war, the mining of radium ore, and the Government's fuel yards in the District of Columbia.

In 1947, the committee was abolished and its duties were transferred to the United States House Committee on Public Lands.

Chairmen

References
Records of the Committee on Mines and Mining (1865- 1946), Records of the Committee on Interior and Insular Affairs and Its Predecessors, Guide to the Records of the U.S. House of Representatives at the National Archives, 1789-1989 (Record Group 233), National Archives and Records Administration

Mines and Mining